SBK Live was a talk radio show aired on WTKS-FM Real Radio in Orlando, Florida, United States.

The show originally ran on Real Radio 104.1 from 7 to 11 pm ET. The program was a mix of current events and upcoming artists, often engaging the local community. Guests included local and national celebrities.
Soul Brother Kevin is currently hosting a popular podcast called the SBK show. It can be found at soulbrotherkevin.com

History
SBK Live was a part of Real Radio 104.1FM, WTKS-FM for more than five years. The final show on 104.1 Real Radio was aired on December 7, 2012.

Cast
The show's cast members were:

SBK
Soul Brother Kevin started when morning talk show host Russ Rollins of The Monsters In The Morning put out a call that he needed a "Brother man from another land" to come and read part of a story for a bit in "an old time nignog voice".  Kevin came in and originally objected to reading the script but then he eventually gave in. As an avid listener he soon enrolled in the internship program and began working with The Monsters, then in middays.  He was soon hired by sister station 105.5 "The Beat" which was in Ft. Myers, where he was number one in evenings for two years straight.

Angel Rivera
Angel started at Real Radio 104.1 as an intern for the Philips Phile. On the Phile, he performed a stunt in which he posed an exchange student from the Commonwealth of Puerto Rico.

After Angel's internship, he began working for Clear Channel Orlando's Sports Talk Station, where he hosted his own auto enthusiast program called Hot Ride Radio. He also worked as an Assistant Promotions coordinator with one of Real Radio's sister stations. During this time, Angel frequently made guest appearances on Real Radio.

Angel became a permanent fixture on the Real Radio when he joined the SBK LIVE show on Saturday nights. Angel's love of music led to his own segment on SBK Live called, "What The Hell is Angel Listening To."

Cabin Boy
Cabin Boy, or "Matt", grew up in Pittsburgh. At the age of 18, Matt left home to attend Penn State University where he then studied journalism. After working in radio for five years, he became the producer and co-host of SBK Live.

Segments
What's Buzzin' on the Net with Angel - Nightly
Tech Talk with Dirty Bird - Tuesdays, 8:15pm
Sing Bitch - Wednesdays, 10pm
Curtis Earth Trivia - Fridays, 10pm
Beer of the Week - Fridays, 10pm featuring a different micro-brew every week

Guests
Attorney Steve Kramer
Lady Raptastic
Robert
Dwight Howard
Master Legend
Kevin James
Rico From Charlotte

References

American talk radio programs